Balazé (Gallo: Balazae) is a commune in the Ille-et-Vilaine department in the Brittany region in northwestern France.

Population

Inhabitants of Balazé are called Balazéens in French.

Gallery

See also
Communes of the Ille-et-Vilaine department

References

External links

Official website 

Mayors of Ille-et-Vilaine Association 

Communes of Ille-et-Vilaine